Jūtarō, Jutaro or Juutarou (written: 重太郎) is a masculine Japanese given name. Notable people with the name include:

, Japanese baseball player
, Japanese artist

Jutarō, Jutaro or Jutarou  (written:  or ) is a separate given name, though it may be romanized the same way. Notable people with the name include:

, Japanese diplomat
, Japanese mixed martial artist

Japanese masculine given names